This article is a partial list of business schools in Texas. Business schools are listed in alphabetical order by name. Schools named after people are alphabetized by last name. The AACSB International―The Association to Advance Collegiate Schools of Business is the oldest, largest, and most respected of the accreditation boards for business schools. Membership status of the business schools are included in this list. 

 
Texas